Double H may refer to:

 Double "H" Ranch, a year-round program for children and families faced with life-threatening or chronic illnesses
 Double H High Adventure Base, the newest National High Adventure program of the Boy Scouts of America
 Double-H Boots, a manufacturer of western footwear

See also

 Double H Mountains
 HH (disambiguation)